Pinaxia is a genus of sea snails, marine gastropod mollusks in the family Muricidae, the murex snails or rock snails.

Species
Species within the genus Pinaxia include:

Pinaxia coronata (H. Adams, 1853)
Pinaxia versicolor (Gray, 1839)

References